Juan Carlos Botero Navia is a Colombian lawyer and researcher, who served as Executive Director of the World Justice Project in Washington, DC and as co-author of its WJP Rule of Law Index and Open Government Index.

International institutional indicators 
At the World Justice Project, Botero has led the development of the methodology, piloting, and implementation of the WJP Rule of Law Index for the past five years. This work on "leximetrics" was controversial due to the findings, and suspect methodology, which purported to show that effective labour law damaged economic productivity. More detailed work has been carried out at the Cambridge Judge Business School found the opposite. 

His previous experience as a researcher at Yale University and the World Bank focused on developing indicators to measure the performances of legal and judicial institutions in countries around the world. 

Botero is a member of the World Economic Forum's Global Agenda Council on the Rule of Law, currently serving as a member of the Global Agenda Council on Justice, and is a member of the advisory boards for Citizens for Justice Malawi and the Hague Journal on the Rule of Law.

Colombian government 
Botero has served the Colombian government in many capacities, including as Chief International Legal Counsel of the Ministry of Commerce, Industry and Tourism; international trade negotiator and chief counsel of the US-Colombia Free Trade Agreement; and Director of the Colombian Government Trade Bureau in Washington D.C. 

He also served as member of the Advisory Board of the Superintendency of Industry and Commerce and as Judicial Clerk for Justice Carlos Gaviria Diaz, at the Constitutional Court.

Academic career 
A national of Colombia, Botero holds a law degree from Universidad de los Andes, a Master of Law from Harvard University and a Doctor of Juridical Science (SJD) from Georgetown University.  He has taught legal theory and comparative law at the Universidad de los Andes in Colombia and Universidad Privada Boliviana in Bolivia.

He also served as Director of the Instituto de Ciencia Politica in Colombia. His academic publications have focused on the areas of rule of law, labor regulation, child labor, and judicial reform. He is a member of the bars of Colombia and New York state.

Publications 
 WJP Rule of Law Index 2015(with A. Ponce, J. Martinez, and C. Pratt). Washington DC. The World Justice Project, June 2015.
 WJP Open Government Index 2015(with A. Ponce, J. Martinez, and C. Pratt). Washington DC. The World Justice Project, March 2015.
 WJP Rule of Law Index 2014(with A. Ponce, J. Martinez, and C. Pratt). Washington DC. The World Justice Project, March 2014.
 WJP Rule of Law Index 2012-2013(with M. Agrast, A. Ponce, J. Martinez, and C. Pratt). Washington DC. The World Justice Project, November 2012.
 
 
 
 
 
 
 
 
 
 
 WJP Rule of Law Index 2011(with M. Agrast, A. Ponce). Washington DC. The World Justice Project, June 2011.
 "Access to justice in the United States" (with R. Mathews). Virginia Lawyer Magazine, December 2010, Vol. 59, No. 5.
 WJP Rule of Law Index 2010(with M. Agrast, A. Ponce). Washington DC. The World Justice Project, October 2010.
 
 Rule of Law Index 2009 – Report to the World Justice Forum II (with M. Agrast, A. Ponce). Washington DC. The World Justice Project, November 2009.
 
 "The health of children working in the streets of Latin American cities: risks, injuries, and child abuse" (with AM Pinzon-Rondon, L. Briceno, C. Pinzon-Florez). Revista Saludarte. Spanish. Colsubsidio, Colombia. Vol. 6, No. 2. November 2008.
 Measuring Adherence to the Rule of Law around the World – Rule of Law Index 2008 (with M. Agrast, A. Ponce, C. Dumas). Washington DC.  The World Justice Project, July 2008.
 "Generalidades del Tratado de Libre Comercio con Estados Unidos." Chapter in book El TLC y el Derecho de la Distribución Comercial." Universidad Externado de Colombia, Colegio de Abogados de Medellín, Cámara de Comercio de Medellín. Biblioteca Jurídica Dike. Bogotá, 2006.
 "Trabajo Infantil en Calles de Ciudades Latinoamericanas." (with AM Pinzon-Rondon, L Briceno-Ayala, P Cabrera, and MN Rodriguez). Salud Publica Mex. 2006 Sep–Oct;48(5):363-72.
 
 
 Manual de Servicios Financieros (with C. Manrique and A. Saba). Bogotá, Nueva Frontera, 1994.
 "El Estado Robin Hood." Revista Alter Ego. University of Los Andes Law School. Bogotá, 1993.

Awards 
 IX Bienal de Investigación Colsubsidio 2008 (Prize to research in the Americas). First place. Paper: The health of children working in the streets of Latin American cities: risks, injuries, and child abuse.

References

External links 
 www.worldjusticeproject.org*
 www.worldjusticeproject.org/rule-of-law-index
 

Living people
Harvard Law School alumni
University of Los Andes (Colombia) alumni
Academic staff of the University of Los Andes (Colombia)
Year of birth missing (living people)